Ischnocnema henselii is a species of frog in the family Brachycephalidae. It is found in subtropical rain forests in southern Brazil and northeastern Argentina (Misiones Province), and likely in adjacent Paraguay. Its natural habitat is subtropical or tropical moist lowland forests. It is listed as a species of "least concern" on the IUCN Red List of Threatened Species.

References

henselii
Amphibians of Argentina
Amphibians of Brazil
Amphibians described in 1870
Taxa named by Wilhelm Peters